Plaza Caisán is a corregimiento in Renacimiento District, Chiriquí Province, Panama. Its population as of 1990 was 1,927; its population as of 2000 was 2,201.

References

Corregimientos of Chiriquí Province